Stanisław Bedliński (died 1689) was a Roman Catholic prelate who served as Auxiliary Bishop of Lutsk (1683–1689).

Biography
Stanisław Bedliński was born in 1633. On 27 Sep 1683, he was appointed during the papacy of Pope Innocent XI as Auxiliary Bishop of Lutsk and Titular Bishop of Caesaropolis. On 6 Feb 1684, he was consecrated bishop by Mikołaj Oborski, Titular Bishop of Laodicea in Syria. He served as Auxiliary Bishop of Lutsk until his death in 1689.

See also
Catholic Church in Ukraine

References

External links and additional sources
 (for Chronology of Bishops) 
 (for Chronology of Bishops)  

17th-century Roman Catholic bishops in the Polish–Lithuanian Commonwealth
Bishops appointed by Pope Innocent XI
1689 deaths